She Wolves is a 1925 American silent drama film directed by Maurice Elvey and written by Dorothy Yost. It is based on the 1924 play The Man in Evening Clothes by André Picard and Yves Mirande. The film stars Alma Rubens, Jack Mulhall, Bertram Grassby, Harry Myers, Judy King, and Fred Walton. The film was released on April 26, 1925, by Fox Film Corporation.

Plot
As described in a film magazine review, after a young couple become married, the wife becomes deeply chagrined because the husband does not dress and appear with all the care and well groomed clothes she believes he should have. He decides to leave her. In Paris he spends so much on clothes he becomes bankrupt. She learns to appreciate him and there is a reconciliation.

Cast

References

External links
 

1925 films
1920s English-language films
Silent American drama films
1925 drama films
Fox Film films
Films directed by Maurice Elvey
American silent feature films
American black-and-white films
1920s American films